Philippe Lazzarini (born 1964) is a national of Switzerland and Italy who has been serving as Commissioner-General of the United Nations Relief and Works Agency for Palestine Refugees in the Near East (UNRWA) since 2020.

From 2015 until 2020, Lazzarini served as Deputy UN Special Coordinator for Lebanon (UNSCOL), UN Resident and Humanitarian Coordinator and Resident Representative  of the United Nations Development Programme in Lebanon. Prior to this, he was the Deputy Special Representative of the Secretary-General for the United Nations Assistance Mission in Somalia, where he also served as UN Resident and Humanitarian Coordinator and UNDP Resident Representative. Before that Lazzarini held senior positions in the Office for the Coordination of Humanitarian Affairs (OCHA).

Early life and education  
Lazzarini holds a Master in Business Administration from the Faculty of Business and Economics of the University of Lausanne and a bachelor's degree in economics from the University of Neuchâtel.

Career
Lazzarini started his international career in 1989 when he joined the International Committee of the Red Cross (ICRC) and served as delegate in multiple duty stations, including Southern Sudan, Lebanon, Jordan and Gaza. From there Lazzarini went on to lead the ICRC operations in Bosnia, Angola and Rwanda. He also served as Deputy Head of the ICRC Communications Department. In September 1999, Lazzarini joined the Union Bancaire Privée in Geneva where he worked on promoting the corporate social responsibilities and ethical investment agenda of the Bank and as Head of the Marketing Department. 

In 2003, Lazzarini joined the UN Office for the Coordination of Humanitarian Affairs (OCHA) as Area Coordinator in Mossul, Iraq. From there he went on to serve as Head of Office for OCHA in Angola, Somalia, and in the occupied Palestinian territory. In 2010, he became the Deputy Director of the Coordination and Response Division for OCHA and in 2013 he was appointed, under the leadership of Nicholas Kay, as the Deputy Special Representative of the Secretary-General, UN Resident and Humanitarian Coordinator and Resident Representative of the United Nations Development Programme (UNDP) in Somalia. On 24 April 2015, United Nations Secretary-General Ban Ki-moon announced the Lazzarini's appointment as his Deputy Special Coordinator for Lebanon, where he also served as Resident and Humanitarian Coordinator and UNDP Resident Representative, succeeding Ross Mountain; in this capacity, he worked under the leadership of successive Special Coordinators Sigrid Kaag (2015-2017), Pernille Dahler Kardel (2017-2019) and Ján Kubiš (2019-2020).

In 2020, UN Secretary-General António Guterres announced Lazzarini's appointment as new Commissioner-General of the United Nations Relief and Works Agency for Palestine Refugees in the Near East (UNRWA).

Personal life 
Lazzarini is married and has four children. His wife, Antonia Mulvey, is a British lawyer and Founder and Executive Director of Legal Action Worldwide (LAW).

Publications and Interviews 
 "Time to revitalize Lebanon’s economy", 17 June 2016: http://www.dailystar.com.lb/Business/Local/2016/Jun-17/357390-time-to-revitalize-lebanons-economy.ashx
 "Les leçons apprises du Liban au Sommet mondial sur l’action humanitaire", 25 Avril 2016: http://www.lorientlejour.com/article/982775/les-lecons-apprises-du-liban-au-sommet-mondial-sur-laction-humanitaire.html
 "Pulling Lebanon back from the edge of the crisis" 28 January 2016: http://www.dailystar.com.lb/News/Lebanon-News/2016/Jan-28/334355-pulling-lebanon-back-from-the-edge-of-the-crisis.ashx
 "Lebanon’s silent heroes", 19 August 2015: http://www.dailystar.com.lb/News/Lebanon-News/2015/Aug-19/311739-lebanons-silent-heroes.ashx
 Lazzarini to place Lebanon's needs as top priority on global agenda, 15-01-2016: https://assafir.com/Article/50/466890/AuthorArticle
 Lazzarini interview with Annahar Newspaper, 30 September 2015: http://www.un.org.lb/english/latest-news/lazarinni-to-annahar-newspaper-world-bank-has-mtpf-of-above-100-million-in-form-of-loans-for-lebanon-but-these-are-pending-decision-making
 Somalia: Early warning should trigger early action [VIDEO], 22 October 2014: http://www.unocha.org/top-stories/all-stories/somalia-early-warning-should-trigger-early-action-video
 Deputy Special Representative, Resident and Humanitarian Coordinator in Somalia Philippe Lazzarini discusses civil-military dialogue in support of humanitarian action in Somalia, November 2013: http://www.unocha.org/top-stories/all-stories/somalia-early-warning-should-trigger-early-action-video

References

Swiss officials of the United Nations
Living people
1964 births
Italian officials of the United Nations